The 1952 Minnesota Golden Gophers football team represented the University of Minnesota in the 1952 Big Ten Conference football season. In their second year under head coach Wes Fesler, the Golden Gophers compiled a 4–3–2 record and were outscored by their opponents by a combined total of 171 to 131.
 
Halfback Paul Giel was named an All-American by the Associated Press, FWAA and Look Magazine. Giel received Chicago Tribune Silver Football, awarded to the most valuable player of the Big Ten. Giel, running back Bob MacNamara and guard Percy Zachary were named All-Big Ten first team. Giel finished third in voting for the Heisman Trophy.

Paul Giel was awarded the Team MVP Award.

Total attendance for the season was 270,292, which averaged to 54,058. The season high for attendance was against rival Iowa.

Schedule

References

Minnesota
Minnesota Golden Gophers football seasons
Minnesota Golden Gophers football